Keum Sae-rok (born 6 September 1992) is a South Korean actress. She is known for her prominent roles in The Fiery Priest (2019) and Youth of May (2021).

Personal life 
Keum graduated from the Seoul Institute of the Arts with a degree in acting.

Career 
Keum began her career appearing in TV commercials and short films before landing minor roles in mainstream films The Silenced (2015), Assassination (2015) and Love, Lies (2016).

In 2017, she was cast in a supporting role in the hit thriller Believer (2018).

In 2018, she first drew notice as one of the daughters in the family drama Marry Me Now. Her subsequent performance as a tough rookie detective in the comedy television series The Fiery Priest (2019) brought her wider recognition and won her Best New Actress at the 2019 SBS Drama Awards.

In 2019, Keum joined the film The King's Letters, followed by Our Body. 

In 2020, Keum joined tvN's Drama Stage Season 3: Everyone Is There. 

In 2021, Keum joined the SBS drama Joseon Exorcist, but it only aired 2 episodes. It was canceled due to historical distortions, which caused Keum to write an apology letter. Keum later joined the KBS drama Youth of May, which was based on the Gwangju Uprising. Later, Keum joined the SBS variety program Baek Jong-won's Alley Restaurant. In July, Keum joined the cast of the film Open the Door. 

On December 10, 2021, it was reported that Keum had terminated her contract with UL Entertainment and decided not to renew the contract after 5 years. On December 20, 2021, it was announced that Keum had signed a contract with History D&C.

Filmography

Film

Television series

Web series

Television shows

Awards and nominations

References

External links 
 
 

1992 births
Living people
South Korean film actresses
South Korean television actresses
Seoul Institute of the Arts alumni